The 2008 Open 13 was a men's tennis tournament played on indoor hard courts. It was the 16th edition of the Open 13, and was part of the International Series of the 2008 ATP Tour. It took place at the Palais des Sports in Marseille, France, from 11 February through 17 February 2008.

The field featured World No. 3 and Australian Open champion Novak Djokovic, ATP No. 7 and 2007 Paris Masters semifinalist Richard Gasquet, and ATP No. 8 and Australian Open quarterfinalist Mikhail Youzhny. Among other top players were Doha titlist Andy Murray, Auckland runner-up Juan Carlos Ferrero, Marcos Baghdatis, Jo-Wilfried Tsonga and Paul-Henri Mathieu.

Finals

Singles

 Andy Murray defeated  Mario Ančić, 6–3, 6–4
 It was Murray's 2nd title of the year, and his 5th overall.

Doubles

 Martin Damm /  Pavel Vízner defeated  Yves Allegro /  Jeff Coetzee, 7–6(7–0), 7–5

References

External links
 Official website
 ITF tournament edition details
 Singles draw
 Doubles draw

 
Open 13